Tsabong, also spelled Tshabong, is the administrative centre of the Kgalagadi District in Botswana. It is located in the Kalahari Desert. The population was 8939 at the 2011 census.

The primary hospital in Tsabong serves a huge outlying area and includes several tuberculosis refuges where patients and their families can stay while undergoing lengthy outpatient treatment.

Near the town is the Tsabong kimberlite field, one of the largest diamondiferous kimberlite fields in the world.

The town is served by Tshabong Airport.

The Botswana Prison Service (BPS) operates the Tsabong Prison.

Schools 
 Tsabong Primary school 
 Nhake Primary school 
 Seetelo Memorial Primary school 
 Tsabong Unified Secondary School

TM MALL

 Sefalana Supermarket 
PEP stores 
Absa bank 
 Furnmart Furniture store 
 CashBazar  
 JB 
 Saba 
 Kgalagadi Pharmacy 
 Choppies  
 Trans Wholesale 
 Tsabong Hyper
 Tsabong Water Utilities Customer service

References

Populated places in Botswana
District capitals in Botswana
Kgalagadi District